Nanpu is a town in the Quangang District of Quanzhou municipality, Fujian.

Administration
The town executive, CPC sub-branch and PSB sub-station (paichusuo, 派出所) are seated in Liucuo.

The town administers 15 village committees:
 Liucuo
 Shicuo
 Qiucuo
 Kecuo
 Xiaocuo
 Nanpu










Notes and references

Quanzhou